A smokehouse (North American) or smokery (British) is a building where meat or fish is cured with smoke. The finished product might be stored in the building, sometimes for a year or more. Even when smoke is not used, such a building—typically a subsidiary building—is sometimes referred to as a "smokehouse".  When smoke is not used, the term meathouse or meat house is common.

History
Traditional smokehouses served both as meat smokers and to store the meats, often for groups and communities of people. Food preservation occurred by salt curing and extended cold smoking for two weeks or longer. Smokehouses were always secured to prevent animals and thieves from accessing the food. The meat is hung to keep it from the reach of varmints and vermin.

Prior to the widespread availability of mains electricity and freezers, meat was preserved by heavy salting. Hogs were slaughtered after the onset of cold weather, and hams and other pork products were salted and hung up or placed on a shelf to last into the following summer. Whether the meat should be smoked as well as salted is personal preference, frequently backed up with strong local or family custom.

Design and use
Traditionally, a smokehouse is a small enclosed outbuilding often with a vent, a single entrance, no windows, and frequently has a gabled or pyramid-style roof. Communal and commercial smokehouses are larger than those that served a single residence or estate. The use of slightly warmed, dry air from a very slow hardwood fire will ensure the proper drying of meats.

As a preserved ham represents a big financial investment, smokehouses in the Carolinas and Virginia can frequently be identified by their framing, so closely spaced as to prevent forcible entry and theft. The lower interior walls of both meat houses and smoke houses are characterized by the extreme furring of the wood, caused by the salt.

The upper areas of smokehouses are blackened with smoke. A meat house has a solid wood floor, a smokehouse will have a brick pit in the center of the dirt floor, or sometimes a broken/cast-off cast iron pot, for the fire. Jefferson's smokehouse at Monticello is an integral part of the brick outbuildings. It has a conventional brick fireplace built into an exterior wall – its flue discharges into the smokehouse.

See also

 List of smoked foods

References

External links
 

Smokehouses
Agricultural buildings
Food preservation
Meat industry